The  is a group of Japanese Buddhist temples linked on a pilgrimage route.

The Chichibu Pilgrimage 
Chichibu City in the province of Saitama is the centre of a virtually self-contained valley, a mountain-ringed basin about 80 km north-west of Tokyo.

The Chichibu pilgrimage dates back to the early 13th century.  It originally consisted of 33 temples dedicated to Kannon but by 1536 a 34th temple was added to the list with the consequence that the Saigoku, Bandō and Chichibu pilgrimages together form a 100-temple Kannon pilgrimage. Visitors in numbers have been making the journey here since the Muromachi Period (1336–1573), covering the 100 kilometres it takes to reach all the temples. About two-thirds of the temples are located in urban areas; the rest are in more rural settings. Unlike the temples on the Saigoku or Bandō routes, the Chichibu temples are relatively small and understated; many of them resemble neighbourhood temples. Admission to all 34 temples is free. It is said that about half of the 34 temples do not have resident priests and are maintained by caretakers who live nearby.

The following list contains the temples of the Chichibu list.

Temples

See also 
 Japan 100 Kannon, pilgrimage composed of the Saigoku, Bandō and Chichibu pilgrimages.
 Saigoku 33 Kannon, pilgrimage in the Kansai region. 
 Bandō 33 Kannon, pilgrimage in the Kantō region.
 The hundred Kannon Prilgrimage in Musashi Province, pilgrimage composed of the Chichibu, Musashino and Sayama pilgrimages. 
 Musashino Kannon Pilgrimage, pilgrimage in Tokyo and Saitama prefectures.
 Sayama Kannon Pilgrimage, pilgrimage in Tokyo and Saitama prefectures.
 Shikoku Pilgrimage, 88 Temple pilgrimage in the Shikoku island. 
 Chūgoku 33 Kannon, pilgrimage in the Chūgoku region.
 Kannon
 Buddhism in Japan
 Tourism in Japan
 For an explanation of terms concerning Japanese Buddhism, Japanese Buddhist art, and Japanese Buddhist temple architecture, see the Glossary of Japanese Buddhism.

Temples in Japan
Japanese pilgrimages
Buddhist pilgrimages